The Heat with Mark McEwan is a Canadian food and catering show produced by General Purpose Pictures which airs on Food Network in Canada. It is hosted by Mark McEwan, a Celebrity chef based in Toronto. In the show, Mark heads a team of skilled chefs and caterers pulled from his restaurants 'North 44', 'Bymark' and 'ONE' as he caters various upscale Canadian events.

Show format
Mark acts as the driving narrative for each episode. Catering large-scale events with staff at varying skill levels and competency results in entertaining theatrics as Mark coaches and directs his team.

Integrated Marketing
In June 2009 Mark opened 'McEwan' a high end grocery store located at the 'Shops at Don Mills' in Toronto. Season 3 of The Heat largely tells the story of the opening of the store and the many problems that McEwan faced in its construction.

To coincide with the launch of his first grocery store Mark also launched his own branded line of cookware and utensils.

External links 
 Official website
 Food Network Micro Site

2000s Canadian cooking television series
2010s Canadian cooking television series
2008 Canadian television series debuts
Food reality television series
2010 Canadian television series endings